WSVW-LD (channel 30) is a low-power television station in Harrisonburg, Virginia, United States, affiliated with NBC and The CW Plus. It is owned by Gray Television alongside ABC affiliate WHSV-TV (channel 3) and Class A dual Fox/CBS affiliate WSVF-CD (channel 43). The three stations share studios on North Main Street (US 11) in downtown Harrisonburg, and operate a newsroom in Fishersville, serving Staunton, Waynesboro, and Augusta County. WSVW-LD's transmitter is located atop Massanutten Mountain. There is no separate website for WSVW-LD; instead, it is integrated with that of sister station WHSV-TV.

W22EX-D (virtual channel 30, UHF digital channel 22) in Staunton operates as a translator of WSVW-LD; this station's transmitter is located atop Elliott Knob west of Staunton.

Even though WSVW-LD and W22EX-D both have digital signals of their own, their low-power broadcast ranges only cover the immediate Harrisonburg and Staunton areas, respectively. Therefore, the NBC-affiliated main feed is simulcast in 1080i full high definition on WHSV-TV's second digital subchannel in order to reach the entire market; this signal can be seen on UHF channel 20.2 (or virtual channel 3.2 via PSIP) from a separate transmitter atop Elliott Knob.

History
The station signed on in June 2011 as W30CT-D, a translator of Charlottesville-based NBC affiliate WVIR-TV (channel 29). W30CT-D was one of two translators of WVIR-TV for the Harrisonburg-Staunton-Waynesboro market, broadcasting from Massanutten Mountain for Harrisonburg. A second translator, W41DT-D (currently W22EX-D), signed on earlier in the year from Elliott Knob to cover the other cities. For years, WVIR had been one of the default NBC affiliates piped into the Shenandoah Valley on cable, along with WRC-TV in Washington, D.C. and WWBT in Richmond.

On March 4, 2019, Waterman Broadcasting announced a deal to sell WVIR-TV, along with W30CT-D and W22EX-D, to Gray Television on that day. Gray already owned CBS-affiliated rival WCAV and ABC affiliate WVAW-LD (channel 16), which were concurrently sold to Lockwood Broadcast Group. WVIR became a sister station to Fox affiliate WAHU-CD (channel 27, now WVIR-CD), which was not included in the sale and retained by Gray to serve as a WVIR-TV translator. The sale was approved on April 15, and the transaction was completed on October 1.

The next day, WVIR-TV's new sister station WHSV-TV announced that it would convert the two translators into separate NBC/CW+ affiliates for Harrisonburg, effective December 1; concurrently with the announcement, W30CT-D became WSVW-LD. As announced, WSVW-LD/W22EX-D were converted into dual NBC/CW+ affiliates for Harrisonburg on December 1.

The station relies primarily on cable and satellite for its viewership, which are all but essential for acceptable television in this vast and mountainous market. Although it would not normally qualify for must-carry due to its low-power status, it is carried on all Shenandoah Valley cable systems due to the retransmission consent provision of the must-carry rules. This provision allows full-power stations to request compensation from cable systems as a condition of carrying them. In this case, Gray has the right to require cable systems to carry WSVW as part of the compensation for carrying WHSV.

Technical information

Subchannels
The station's digital signal is multiplexed:

Translator

References

External links

The CW affiliates
SVW-LD
Low-power television stations in the United States
NBC network affiliates
Circle (TV network) affiliates
Gray Television